"The Last Laugh" is the third episode of the second season and 25th episode overall from the FOX series Gotham. The episode was written by John Stephens and directed by Eagle Egilsson. It was first broadcast on October 5, 2015, in FOX.

In this episode, in the aftermath of the GCPD massacre, Gordon and Bullock begin looking for Jerome Valeska. Meanwhile, Galavan plans his next move at a gala trying to act as a "hero" to the public.

The episode was watched by 4.33 million viewers but received mixed-to-positive reviews with critics debating whether the plot twist was surprising or disappointing.

Plot

With the GCPD recovering from the massacre and death of Commissioner Sarah Essen, Gordon (Benjamin McKenzie) and Bullock (Donal Logue) start questioning people on the street for info on Jerome (Cameron Monaghan). They decide to go to Jerome's father, Paul Cicero (Mark Margolis), to see if he knows where his son is. Jerome and Tabitha have already captured Paul in his own apartment, and when Jerome asks for his future, Paul states that he'll be a curse upon Gotham and that his legacy will be death and madness. Jerome kills his dad, and when Gordon and Bullock get there, Jerome's sleeping gas knocks out Bullock and Gordon is kicked in the face by Tabitha (Jessica Lucas), allowing her and Jerome to escape.

Elsewhere, Theo (James Frain) reveals the next stage of his plan as Barbara (Erin Richards) had a romantic encounter with Tabitha. Theo states his family built Gotham and that he will get revenge on those who stole the credit for doing so. Bruce (David Mazouz) and Alfred (Sean Pertwee) attend the Gotham Children's Hospital Gala and run into Leslie (Morena Baccarin). Having no idea Leslie is in a relationship with Jim, Alfred flirts with her. Bruce later encounters Selina, who claims she is "working." As part of Theo's plan, Jerome and Barbara disguise themselves and take over the show. Leslie recognizes Jerome and Barbara and tries to call Jim, but is kidnapped by one of Theo's henchmen.

When assistant Deputy Mayor Kane (Norm Lewis) is called to the stage, Jerome throws a knife to his chest and reveals himself and Barbara, holding everyone hostage. Theo comes and tries playing hero, demanding that Jerome and Barbara stop, until Barbara pretends to knock him out with a mallet. As Bruce and Selina are about to leave, Bruce tells Selina he misses her, and goes back to save Alfred.

While Jerome is terrifying the hostages, Barbara ties Leslie to a spinning wheel, taunting her about how she and Jim will get back together in a year, and will tell their grandchildren that a "man eating harpie" almost tore them apart. Leslie kicks Barbara in the crotch, and in retaliation, Barbara tries to stab Leslie, but Jerome stops her.

Jerome threatens to kill Alfred unless Bruce gets on the stage. Unwilling to let his only family die, Bruce gets on the stage, and Jerome holds a knife to his neck until Jim and Alfred start shooting the henchmen. Jerome tries to kill Bruce but Theo regains consciousness and stabs Jerome in the neck, killing him and making Theo look like a hero in front of the camera. Barbara escapes through a trap door on the stage.

Bullock confronts Penguin (Robin Lord Taylor) about the rumors circulating that Jim did a favor for him, but Penguin denies it. Bullock tells the self-proclaimed "King of Gotham" that he still sees Penguin as the umbrella boy he and Jim first met, and threatens to beat him if he goes after Jim again, and he still wants revenge for Fish's death. Alfred tries to flirt with Leslie again only for him to realize that she is with Jim, much to Alfred's disappointment. Alfred then gets annoyed at Bruce, thinking he knew, which Bruce denies.

Back at their hideout, Barbara kisses Theo on the cheek, where Tabitha watches in jealousy. Although Jerome is dead, people are still amazed at his sadistic and clever nature, and it gets to the point where people start committing homicidal acts of their own, proving Cicero's prediction true. The last shot shows Jerome's smiling corpse with the echoing of his laugh in the background.

Production

Development
On killing Jerome, showrunner Bruno Heller talked in an interview for ComicBook.com: "We always knew, it's one of those things, when we saw Cameron's performance and how brilliant he was, there was a moment of 'oh hell, this guy is genius!' But we had a storyline that has to go how it has to go, otherwise it'd be cheating. So to that degree, there was some second guessing that 'oh hell, we're losing this brilliant young actor".

In another interview, Cameron Monaghan talked about his character getting killed: "In many ways the episode is, at least it was for me, a love letter to the character and to 75 years of the character in that it's an acknowledgment that there's something about this personality that is infectious and seductive. It sticks in your brain in a way that it just lodges in there and it can burrow its way into a popular consciousness — obviously the character of the Joker has. So we see a reflection of that in that this man, this personality, it ripples across the city in some meaningful way. That's what it was for me, at least".

Writing
When asked about Jerome returning, writer John Stephens stated that "if you watch the episodes closely, as they go forward this year you'll start seeing the seeds of the way that story will continue to develop. And we probably have not seen the last of that fellow".

Reception

Ratings
The episode was watched by 4.33 million viewers. This was a decrease in viewership from the previous episode, which was watched by 4.65 million viewers. This made Gotham the most watched program of the day in FOX, beating Minority Report.

Critical reviews

"Rise of the Villains: The Last Laugh" received generally positive reviews from critics. The episode received a rating of 64% with an average score of 6.1 out of 10 on the review aggregator Rotten Tomatoes, with the site's consensus stating: "Gotham successfully delivers on a fun origin story, even if the big twist at the end of "The Last Laugh" feels unearned."

Matt Fowler of IGN gave the episode a "great" 8.0 out of 10 and wrote in his verdict: "'The Last Laugh,' while kicking things off with a gala premise that one really needed to stretch in order to believe, got more right than it did wrong. And it gave us a very fun, over-the-top Joker/Harley dynamic in the form of Jerome and Barbara's hostage plot. Jerome being menacing-yet-controlling while Barbara was more spontaneous and prone to emotion (especially after Leslie kicked her). Barbara's new relationship with Tabitha fits her flighty, craziness, though I don't know how up I am for a whole sibling jealousy story to take root given how little we know, at this point, about the Galavans."

The A.V. Clubs Kyle Fowle gave the episode a "C+" grade and wrote, "If there's hope here though, it's in the episode's implication that Gordon will eventually have to compromise his ethics to truly clean up Gotham and take down Galavan, even if Gordon doesn't know Theo is the bad guy yet. Still, 'Rise Of The Villains: The Last Laugh' is a troubling crack in this season's otherwise sturdy structure, and it may not be long before everything comes crashing down."

References

External links 
 

Gotham (season 2) episodes
2015 American television episodes
Patricide in fiction